Parsana is a monotypic genus of flowering plants belonging to the family Urticaceae. It just contains one species, Parsana malekiana Parsa & Maleki 

It is native to Iran.

The genus name of Parsana is in honour of Ahmad Parsa (1907–1997), an Iranian botanist and co-author of the genus. The Latin specific epithet of malekiana refers to Zeynol-Abedin (or Zeinolabedin) Maleki, (1913-) the other co-author of the plant genus and species.
Both the genus and the species were first described and published in A.Parsa, Fl. Iran, Suppl. Gen. on page 548 in 1952.

References

Urticaceae
Urticaceae genera
Plants described in 1952
Flora of Iran
Monotypic Rosales genera